Inocencio Pérez (born 1870 - death date unknown) was a Cuban baseball pitcher in the Cuban League and Negro leagues. He played from 1904 to 1907 with several clubs, including Almendares club, Habana, the Cuban Stars (West), and the All Cubans.

External links

1870 births
Year of death missing
Cuban League players
Cuban baseball players
Habana players
Almendares (baseball) players
All Cubans players
Cuban X-Giants players
Cuban Stars (West) players
San Francisco (baseball) players